Besa Shahini (born 1982) is a Kosovo-born Albanian politician, who served as the Minister of Education, Sports and Youth in the second cabinet of Edi Rama.

References 

Living people
Place of birth missing (living people)
21st-century Albanian politicians
Government ministers of Albania
Women government ministers of Albania
Education ministers of Albania
Sports ministers of Albania
Youth ministers of Albania
1982 births
People educated at a United World College
21st-century Albanian women politicians